The 2021 Tour of Norway was a men's road cycling stage race which is took place from 19 to 22 August 2021. It was the 10th edition of the Tour of Norway, which was rated as a 2.Pro event on the 2021 UCI Europe Tour and the 2021 UCI ProSeries calendars. This edition was the race's first in the UCI ProSeries; the 2020 edition was expected to feature in the inaugural UCI ProSeries but was cancelled due to the COVID-19 pandemic.

The race was originally six stages long and scheduled to be held from 19–24 May, but it was later reduced to four stages and scheduled to begin instead on 21 May. However, on 16 April, the shortened race was postponed to 19–22 August due to a spike in COVID-19 cases.

Teams 
Seven of the 19 UCI WorldTeams, two UCI ProTeams, and ten UCI Continental teams made up the nineteen teams that participated in the race. , with five riders, was the only team to not enter a full squad of six riders. 113 riders started the race, of which 104 finished.

UCI WorldTeams

 
 
 
 
 
 
 

UCI ProTeams

 
 

UCI Continental Teams

Schedule

Stages

Stage 1 
19 August 2021 – Egersund to Sokndal,

Stage 2 
20 August 2021 – Sirdal to Sirdal,

Stage 3 
21 August 2021 – Jørpeland to Jørpeland,

Stage 4 
22 August 2021 – Stavanger to Stavanger,

Classification leadership table 

 On stages 2 and 3, Ide Schelling, who was second in the points classification, wore the dark blue jersey, because first-placed Ethan Hayter wore the orange jersey as the leader of the general classification. For the same reason, Mike Teunissen wore the dark blue jersey on stage 4, and Anthon Charmig, who was second in the mountains classification, wore the polka-dot jersey on stage 2.

Final classification standings

General classification

Points classification

Mountains classification

Young rider classification

Team classification

Notes

References

Sources

External links 
 

2021
Tour of Norway
Tour of Norway
Tour of Norway
Tour of Norway
Tour of Norway, 2021